The Gilort is a river in southern Romania, a left tributary of the river Jiu. The Gilort flows through the villages and towns Novaci, Bălcești, Bengești, Târgu Cărbunești, Jupânești, Turburea and Capu Dealului. It flows into the Jiu near Țânțăreni.

Tributaries

The following rivers are tributaries to the river Gilort (from source to mouth):

Left: Setea Mică, Setea Mare, Pleșcoaia, Romanul, Dâlbanu, Rânca, Înșiratele, Cerbu, Măgura, Scărița, Gilorțel, Pârâul Galben, Câlnic, Bârzei, Ștefănești, Vladimir, Cocorova, Arpadia, Valea Iepei

Right: Tărtărău, Măcăria, Valea Novaci, Hirișești, Ciocadia, Blahnița, Socul, Purcari, Sterpoaia, Groșerea, Valea lui Câine

References

 
Rivers of Romania
Rivers of Gorj County